Party Animals is an album by the Norwegian rock band Turbonegro, released in April 2005 in Norway and May 2005 in the rest of Europe. It is the final album in the "Apocalypse trilogy". It was released on Burning Heart Records in Sweden, on Bitzcore Records in Germany, and on 23 August 2005 via Abacus Recordings in the United States.

Burning Heart Records also released a version with bonus DVD. It comes with a cardboard sleeve around the jewel-cased CD/DVD. The bonus DVD contains the Hank von Helvete workout video.

Music
For the first time it was decided to work with an external producer. The basic tracks were all recorded in November through December 2004 in Oslo, then finished and mixed in Los Angeles in early 2005 together with Steven Shane McDonald. The album sound appears rather fierce, blunt and with less focus on studio production refinements in comparison to its predecessor Scandinavian Leather.

Keith Morris and Nick Oliveri  contribute guest vocals on one song each, as well as the Norwegian Kringkastings Orchestra to supply the dark creeping atmosphere for the six-minute long song "City of Satan", Turbonegro's ode to their hometown of Oslo.

Bassist Happy-Tom has stated that the album was inspired by the likes of the Rolling Stones, Black Flag and Shostakovich.

Track listing
All songs by Turbonegro.

 "Intro: The Party Zone" – 1:58
 "All My Friends Are Dead" – 2:36
 "Blow Me (Like the Wind)" – 3:16
 "City of Satan" – 5:42
 "Death from Above" – 3:03
 "Wasted Again" – 3:07
 "High on the Crime" – 3:19
 "If You See Kaye (Tell Her I L-O-V-E Her)" – 2:59
 "Stay Free" – 3:45
 "Babylon Forever" – 3:51
 "Hot Stuff/Hot Shit" – 4:00
 "Final Warning" – 2:33
 (CD-only hidden track) "My Name is Bojan Milankovic" – 4:29

Personnel

Turbonegro
Hank Von Helvete (Hans Erik Dyvik Husby) – lead vocals
Euroboy (Knut Schreiner) – lead guitar, piano, backing vocals
Rune Rebellion (Rune Grønn) – rhythm guitar
Pål Pot Pamparius (Pål Bottger Kjærnes) – keyboards, guitar, percussion, backing vocals
Happy-Tom (Thomas Seltzer) – bass guitar, Backing vocals
Chris Summers (Christer Engen) – drums, backing vocals

Additional musicians
The Norwegian Radio Orchestra on "City of Satan" and "Final Warning" arranged by Gaute Storaas, conducted by Ingar Bergby, recorded by Arne Kristian Dypvik, Morten Hermansen and Inger Kvalvik
Gaute Drevdal – keyboards on "Intro" and "Blow Me (Like the Wind)"
Anders Møller – congas on "Babylon Forever"
Mathias Eick and Lars Horntveth – horns
The Artist Formerly Known as the Greatest Beerdrinker in the World, Keith Morris – guest vocals on "Wasted Again"
Nick Oliveri – guest vocals on "Final Warning"
Tomas Dahl, Steven Shane McDonald – backing vocals
Keith Morris – backing vocals on "Wasted Again"

Production
Alexander Benjaminsen – photo production
Marius Bodin – engineer
Arne Kristian Dypvik – engineer
Evan Frankfort – mixing
Joe Giron – photo production
Morten Hermansen – engineer
Erin Kredel – make-Up
Inger Kvalvik – engineer
Martin Kvamme – design
Johanna Lacabanne – costume design
Sebastian Ludvigsen – photography
Steven Shane McDonald – producer
Aders Møller – engineer
Chris Sansom – engineer
Pia Simensen – costume design
Gaute Storaas – arranger
Turbonegro – producer
Aleks Tamulis – assistant
Brad Vance – mastering

In media
 "All My Friends Are Dead" was featured in Jackass Number Two, Viva La Bam, Bam's Unholy Union, Dirty Sanchez: The Movie, Norwegian horror movie Fritt Vilt, CSI: Miami, and also in the French amateur movie Morbid Wanka. It was also featured in Just Cause 4’s DLC pack Dare Devils of Destruction. 
 "City of Satan" is featured in the first episode of series 2 of the NRK series Skam.
 "Wasted Again" is featured as a downloadable track for the Rock Band series of video games.

References

Turbonegro albums
2005 albums
Burning Heart Records albums